Tannheim (Württemberg) is a municipality in the district of Biberach, Baden-Württemberg, Germany.

Geography 
It is located in upper Swabia at the river Iller which forms the border to Bavaria.

Sights 
Church of St. Martin, built 1700–1702

Entertainment and culture  
Tannheim was the home of the annual Tannkosh airshow from 1993 to 2013.

Notable citizens 
Norbert Kiechle (1885–1966), former Landrat
Richard Ferdinand Maximilian Ignatius Joseph Valentin Hubertus Maria Graf von Schaesberg-Tannheim (1884–1953), nobleman and businessman, winner of an Olympic silver medal (1912);
Josef Dreier (born 1931), politician, former Secretary of State, Baden-Württemberg
Matthias Dolderer (born 1970), German pilot and Red Bull Air Race Champion (2016)
Ralph Brunner (born 1971), recipient of Paralympic medals, 2000

References

External links
Official Web site

Biberach (district)
Württemberg